Melica hunzikeri is a species of grass that is endemic to southern South America.

Description
The leaf-sheaths are tubular and are closed on one end with its surface being glabrous or puberulous. The leaf-blades are glabrous and stiff with scaberulous surface and acuminate apex. There are 3–4 branches per panicle which have dominant axis.

The pedicels are curved, filiform, and scaberulous. The fruits are caryopses and have an additional pericarp.

References

hunzikeri
Flora of South America